Gisundet is a strait in Senja Municipality in Troms og Finnmark county, Norway. The strait flows into the Malangen fjord in the north and into the Finnfjorden (and later the Solbergfjorden) in the south. The strait is crossed by the Gisund Bridge which connects the village of Silsand on the island to the town of Finnsnes on the mainland.

References

Straits of Norway
Landforms of Troms og Finnmark
Senja